Galgalatz or GLGLZ is  an Israeli radio station, operated by Israel Defense Forces Radio. This is the second of two Israel Defense Forces-operated stations, while the first one is Israel Defense Forces Radio/Galatz. The station was established in 1993 and broadcasts primarily nonstop (mainly English-language and Hebrew) pop and rock music and traffic reports, and few content programs. The station was established with the aid of the Israeli Ministry of Transportation (the Israeli National Authority for Traffic Safety), and frequently broadcasts Traffic Safety messages. At the top of every hour the station broadcasts a news report.

The meaning of the name 
The first station of the Israel Defense Forces, established in 1950 is called Israel Defense Forces Radio/Galatz which is an Acronym of Galei Tzahal (Galei Tzahal, lit. IDF Waves). This second station was supposed to have traffic safety content in its broadcast, so the name had to express this uniqueness of the station. The word "Galgal" is Hebrew for wheel and symbolizes the connection to traffic. "Galgalatz" is a portmanteau of "Galgal" and "Galatz". This name was created by  Merav Michaeli.

Charts 
Galgalatz airs every Thursday the "Official Music Chart Of Israel", which includes top 10 Israeli and international songs, based on the audience's choice on the station's website. The last Friday of the year, Galgaltz also broadcasts the Israeli annual international song chart. On 31 December 2019, Galgalatz aired the official hot 100 decade-chart.

Broadcasting frequencies (FM) and sites 
 Tel Aviv area: 91.8 (broadcast out of Bnei Brak)
 Haifa and the bay area: 107 (broadcast out of Haifa)
 Jerusalem: 107.1 (broadcast out of Jerusalem)
 Beersheba: 99.8 (broadcast out of Mishmar HaNegev)
 Northern Israel: 104.1 (broadcast out of Kiryat Shmona)
 Eilat and Mitzpe Ramon: 107 (broadcast out of Eilat)

See also 
 List of radio stations in Israel
 Israeli annual Hebrew song chart
 Army Radio

External links 
 Galgalatz Homepage 

Army Radio
Publicly funded broadcasters
Radio networks
1993 establishments in Israel